Jason Ferguson may refer to:
 Jason Ferguson (American football), American football defensive tackle
 Jason Ferguson (snooker player), English former snooker player and current chairman of the WPBSA
 Jason Ferguson (writer), American writer and producer